Mosannona is a genus of flowering plants in the family Annonaceae. There are about 14 species native to the Neotropics, distributed from Mexico through Central America and South America particularly in rainforest surrounding the Andes.

Species include:
Mosannona costaricensis
Mosannona depressa
Mosannona discolor
Mosannona garwoodii
Mosannona guatemalensis
Mosannona hypoglauca
Mosannona maculata
Mosannona pachiteae
Mosannona pacifica
Mosannona parva
Mosannona raimondii
Mosannona xanthochlora

References

Annonaceae
Annonaceae genera
Taxonomy articles created by Polbot